"Call Me Up in Dreamland" is a song that was written by Northern Irish singer-songwriter, Van Morrison and included on his 1970 album, His Band and the Street Choir. Brian Hinton describes the song as "life on the road, with 'radio' as a verb and laughing sax."

Recording and composition
The song was recorded in summer, 1970 at the A&R Recording Studios, 46th Street, New York, during the second His Band and the Street Choir sessions.

"Call Me Up in Dreamland" features a moderate 4/4 tempo. It is in the key of A major, with a chord sequence in the verses of A–E–D–A–D–E–A–D–A–E–D–A–D–E–A–D and the chorus of A–D–A–E–A–D–A–E–E♭–D–A. The song also has a tenor saxophone solo from Morrison. The song is composed in a gospel style and prominently features the vocal backing group the Street Choir.

Chart performance
In June 1971 "Call Me Up in Dreamland" rose to No. 95 in the Billboard Hot 100 music charts.

According to Cash Box, the single release was "preceded by exceptional FM play and good AM in-LP picks."

Personnel
Van Morrison: vocal, guitar, tenor saxophone
Alan Hand: piano, organ
Keith Johnson: trumpet
John Klingberg: bass
John Platania: guitar
Jack Schroer: soprano saxophone
Dahaud Shaar (David Shaw): drums

The Street Choir
Larry Goldsmith
Janet Planet
Andrew Robinson
Ellen Schroer
Dahaud Shaar
Martha Velez

Notes

References
Brooks, Ken (1999), In Search of Van Morrison, Andover, Hampshire: Agenda, 
Collis, John (1996). Inarticulate Speech of the Heart, Little Brown and Company, 
Heylin, Clinton (2003), Can You Feel the Silence? Van Morrison: A New Biography, London: Viking, 
Hinton, Brian (1997). Celtic Crossroads: The Art of Van Morrison, Sanctuary, 
Van Morrison Anthology, Los Angeles: Alfred Music Publishing, 1999, 

1971 singles
1970 songs
Van Morrison songs
Songs written by Van Morrison
Song recordings produced by Van Morrison
Warner Records singles